Königsplatz is an U-Bahn station in Munich on the U2 line of the Munich U-Bahn system. It is located in the Maxvorstadt district.

The station is close to many museums including the Kunstareal. The walls behind the platforms are decorated with facsimiles of famous works of art. The station is named after the square above and opened on October 18, 1980. The floor is different from the other stations opened in that year, with gray-blue Azul granite slabs. The pillars are covered with large brown stone and the ceiling has two lighting bands veneered with aluminum fins.

The station was planned under the name Brienner Straße, which runs through Königsplatz above.

See also
 Königsplatz, Munich
 List of Munich U-Bahn stations

References

Munich U-Bahn stations
Railway stations in Germany opened in 1980
1980 establishments in West Germany